Echol Cole and Robert Walker were sanitation workers who died accidentally in Memphis, Tennessee at the corner of Colonial Rd. and Verne Rd. on February 1, 1968. While working that day, the pair sought refuge from a rainstorm in the compactor area of their garbage truck. They were killed when the compactor accidentally activated. Their deaths were a precursor to the Memphis sanitation strike, during which the prominent civil rights leader Martin Luther King Jr. was assassinated.

Accidental deaths
Cole (age 36) and Walker (age 30) were both sanitation workers in Memphis, Tennessee. Both reported for work on February 1, 1968, a day the rain would be later reported as torrential, overflowing the sewers and flooding the streets. While on shift, at around 4:20pm, the pair sought refuge in the back of their truck during a rainstorm. A malfunction followed, and both men were crushed to death by the truck's garbage compactor. Their coworker Elester Gregory, who had been riding in the cab of the truck, said "The motor started racing and the driver stopped and ran around and smashed that button to stop that thing ... I didn’t know what was happening. It looked to me like one of them almost got out, but he got caught and just fell back in there.”

Repercussions

Following their deaths, their widows received no insurance benefits; the city offered one month's pay for each man, and $500 for funeral expenses. Black Memphians donated $100,000 USD to the widows; the United Auto Workers donated an additional $25,000 USD. 

The deaths of Cole and Walker proved to be the catalyst for the Memphis sanitation strike. On February 11, ten days after their deaths, union Local 1733 held a strike meeting where over 400 workers complained that the city refused to provide decent wages and working conditions. The workers wanted immediate action but the city refused.

On Monday February 12, 1968, 930 of 1100 sanitation workers did not show up for work, including 214 of 230 sewer drainage workers. Only 38 of the 108 garbage trucks continued to move.

Their deaths, together with many racial and working-class injustices prompted Martin Luther King Jr. to join a citywide march on March 18. The march ended with police action, but another was scheduled. King was assassinated the evening before the second march.

See also
 I Am a Man!

References

1968 deaths
1968 in Tennessee
February 1968 events in the United States
History of Memphis, Tennessee